James Magee (born 27 December 1995) is an Irish cricketer. He made his first-class debut for Northern Knights in the 2018 Inter-Provincial Championship on 29 May 2018.

References

External links
 

1995 births
Living people
Irish cricketers
Place of birth missing (living people)
Northern Knights cricketers